Oregon Route 153 is an Oregon state highway running from OR 18 in Bellevue to OR 221 near Hopewell. OR 153 is known as the Bellevue-Hopewell Highway No. 153 (see Oregon highways and routes).

OR 153 was established in 2002 as part of Oregon's project to assign route numbers to highways that previously were not assigned.

Route description 

OR 153 begins at an intersection with OR 18 at Bellevue and heads east to Amity. OR 153 then continues east through Hopewell, ending at an intersection with OR 221 1.34 miles east of Hopewell, near the Maud Williamson State Recreation Site. By continuing south on OR 221 (Wallace Road) for 0.3 miles to Wheatland Road, it is possible to cross the Willamette River into Marion County via the Wheatland Ferry.

History 

OR 153 was assigned to the Bellevue-Hopewell Highway in 2002.

Major intersections

References 
 Oregon Department of Transportation, Descriptions of US and Oregon Routes, https://web.archive.org/web/20051102084300/http://www.oregon.gov/ODOT/HWY/TRAFFIC/TEOS_Publications/PDF/Descriptions_of_US_and_Oregon_Routes.pdf, page 27.
 Oregon Department of Transportation, Bellevue-Hopewell Highway #153, ftp://ftp.odot.state.or.us/tdb/trandata/maps/slchart_pdfs_1980_to_2002/Hwy153_2001.pdf

153
Transportation in Yamhill County, Oregon